Jamesomyia is a genus of tephritid  or fruit flies in the family Tephritidae.

Species
Jamesomyia geminata (Loew, 1862)

References

Tephritinae
Tephritidae genera